Michael Keen may refer to:

Michael John Keen (1935–1991), geoscientist
Mike Keen (1940–2009), footballer

See also
Michael Keane (disambiguation)